David Lewis Davies (1873 – 25 November 1937) was a British Labour Party politician. He was the Member of Parliament (MP) for Pontypridd from 1931 to 1937.

He first stood for Parliament at the 1918 general election, when Pontypridd was won by the Coalition Liberal candidate Thomas Lewis. Lewis was forced to seek re-election in July 1922 when he was appointed as a Lord Commissioner of the Treasury (a nominal post held by a government whip), and the by-election was won by a new Labour candidate, Thomas Jones.

Jones held the seat for nine years until he resigned from the House of Commons on 4 February 1931. Davies was the Labour candidate in the resulting by-election, which he won 60% of the votes. He held the seat for a further seven years, until his death in November 1937, aged 64.

References

External links 
 

1873 births
1937 deaths
Miners' Federation of Great Britain-sponsored MPs
UK MPs 1929–1931 
UK MPs 1931–1935
UK MPs 1935–1945
Welsh Labour Party MPs